Pierre-Joseph van Beneden FRS FRSE FGS FZS (19 December 1809 – 8  January 1894) was a Belgian zoologist and paleontologist.

Life
Born in Mechelen, Belgium, he studied medicine at the State University of Leuven, and studied zoology in Paris under Georges Cuvier (1769–1832). In 1831 he became curator at the natural history museum in Leuven, and from 1836 until 1894 was a professor of zoology at the Catholic University of Leuven. In 1842 he became a member of the Académie des sciences de Belgique, becoming its President in 1881. In 1875 became a foreign member of the Royal Society of London and in 1884 an Honorary Fellow of the Royal Society of Edinburgh.

In 1843 he established one of the world's first marine laboratories and aquariums.

He was the father of biologist Edouard van Beneden (1846–1910). Pierre-Joseph van Beneden died in Leuven, Belgium.

Scientific work 
Van Beneden was a specialist in the field of parasitology, being known for his comprehensive studies on the development, transformation, and life-histories of parasitic worms. In 1858 a treatise on this subject won the Grand prix des sciences physiques of the Institut de France. It was published in the "International Scientific Series" (1875), under the title Les commensaux et les parasites dans le règne animal, and was translated into English and German.

He did extensive research in marine biology, and in 1843 established an aquarium and marine laboratory in Ostend. 

With French zoologist Paul Gervais (1816–1879), he published an important work on extinct and living cetaceans titled Ostéographie des Cétacés, vivants et fossiles. His interest in this matter had begun during the excavations rendered necessary by the fortifying of Antwerp, when a number of bones of fossil whales were exposed to view. His papers on the extinct species found near Antwerp were published in the Annales du musée royal d'histoire naturelle de Brucelles, and with them was incorporated a description of the fossil seals which were discovered in the same area.

He introduced the term mutualism in 1876.

Books 
A selection of books by Pierre-Joseph van Beneden with full text available.
 Animal parasites and messmates (1876) Full text available from Archive.org
 Histoire naturelle des balénoptères (1888) Full text available from Archive.org
 Mémoire sur les vers intestinaux (1858) Full text available from Archive.org
 Recherches sur la faune littorale de Belgique: crustacés (1861) Full text available from Archive.org
 Les poissons des côtes de Belgique, leurs parasite et leurs commensaux Full text available from Archive.org
 Histoire naturelle des cétacés des mers d'Europe (1889) Full text available from Archive.org

Distinctions
Van Beneden attended the celebration of the tercentenary of the University of Edinburgh, and was there made an honorary LL.D. He was a foreign member of the Royal Society and also of the Linnæan, Geological, and Zoological societies of London. He was president of the Royal Belgian Academy in 1881, and was created Grand Officer of the Order of Leopold on the occasion of his professorial jubilee. He was elected a Foreign Honorary Member of the American Academy of Arts and Sciences in 1886. He became a foreign member of the Royal Netherlands Academy of Arts and Sciences in 1859. He died in Leuven aged 84 on January 8, 1894. He was always a devout Catholic and, as the writer of his obituary for the Royal Society particularly states, always exhibited "the widest toleration for the views of others".

References

Other sources
 Brice Poreau,   Biologie et complexité : histoire et modèles du commensalisme. Thesis, largely based on the work by Pierre-Joseph Van Beneden. Thèse d'université, Université Lyon 1, France, 4 July 2014.  PDF, 351 pages (in French with English abstract)

External links
 Matthias Breyne et al. The World's very first Marine Station''

1809 births
1894 deaths
Belgian zoologists
Belgian paleontologists
Belgian Roman Catholics
Scientists from Mechelen
Fellows of the American Academy of Arts and Sciences
Foreign Members of the Royal Society
Fellows of the Linnean Society of London
Members of the Royal Netherlands Academy of Arts and Sciences
Corresponding members of the Saint Petersburg Academy of Sciences